Arthur Rodrigues Rezende (born 21 March 1994), simply known as Arthur Rezende, is a Brazilian footballer who plays for Ceará as a midfielder.

Club career
Born in Goiatuba, Goias, Arthur finished his formation with Goiás. In 2015, he was promoted to the main squad, making his senior debuts in the year's Campeonato Goiano.

Arthur became Goiás champion for Goiás in 2015 and 2016.

In 2020 he was Bahia champion for Bahia.

Until May 2022, in all the matches that Arthur scored a goal with the Vila Nova shirt, the team did not leave the field defeated.

Arthur made his Série A debut on 24 May, starting in a 1–0 away win against Palmeiras.

References

External links
Arthur Rezende at playmakerstats.com (English version of ogol.com.br)

1994 births
Sportspeople from Santa Catarina (state)
Living people
Brazilian footballers
Association football midfielders
Campeonato Brasileiro Série A players
Campeonato Brasileiro Série B players
Liga Portugal 2 players
Cypriot First Division players
Goiás Esporte Clube players
Gil Vicente F.C. players
AEL Limassol players
Santa Cruz Futebol Clube players
Boavista Sport Club players
Guarani FC players
Vila Nova Futebol Clube players
Ceará Sporting Club players
Brazilian expatriate footballers
Expatriate footballers in Portugal
Expatriate footballers in Cyprus